The Seidenbeutel brothers were Polish Jewish artists who were twins. Efraim Seidenbeutel and Menasze Seidenbeutel were born on December 7, 1907. They were killed in 1945, at the Flossenbürg concentration camp. They had two brothers who were also artists: Józef, the oldest, was a painter, and Hirsz, the youngest, was a sculptor.

Art
The Seidenbeutels are considered "Interwar Artists" and painted in the Post-expressionism of École de Paris. They painted mostly landscapes and still life scenes. The twins had a unique way of working; one brother would start a painting and the other brother would finish it. They would sign the painting with just their surname. Even the works the twins created separately have an almost identical style.

Biography
The Seidenbeutels were born in Warsaw. Their father, Abraham, was a textile trader, and their mother took care of the eight children. Efraim's and Menasze's six siblings included Józef, the oldest, who was also a painter and Hirsz, who was younger and was a sculptor.

Education
The Seidenbeutels signed up for painting studies in 1921, at the Municipal School of Decorative Arts. In 1922, their sculpture titled “The Portrait of Anski” was shown at the 4th Exhibition of Paintings and Sculptures organized by the Jewish community. Thereafter, they became students at the Academy of Fine Arts in Warsaw, where they belonged to the elitist group "Four" set up by the Rector Tadeusz Pruszkowski. Monika Żeromska remembers that the twins enrolled in school as one student, paid one fee, and took turns attending classes.

The pre-war years
The Seidenbeutels had their studio at the Jewish dorm on Sierakowskiego Street in the Warsaw district of Praga. Frequently, they would go on field trips to small villages and paint en plein air. One of the towns they visited frequently was Kazimierz Dolny. During the late 1920s and early 1930s, they would arrive for a 'season' carrying over 24 stretched canvases each, and complete them in 30–60 days. These canvases would be exhibited in Warsaw and Krakow and would sell out. They met with other artists and inspired younger ones, such as Chaim Goldberg. They met Goldberg when he was eleven-years-old and bought his en plein air gouache; it was Goldberg's first sale.

The Holocaust Years
During World War II and the Nazi occupation, the Seidenbeutels were confined within the ghetto in Białystok where they worked at the House of Art in the army. They may have belonged to a group of painters, set up by Oskar Steffens, who copied reproductions of paintings by old masters. The twins were later sent to the Stutthof concentration camp, from which they were marched to the death camp in Flossenbürg. They were executed by the camp’s guards one day before the camp was liberated. Izaak Celnikier, also a painter, was a witness to their deaths.

Their unique bond
The Seidenbeutels had a unique bond that intrigues experts to the present day. One brother would start a painting while the other completed it, and the signature was their surname. They signed their paintings this way even when completing a painting individually.

Their similar looks became the subject of jokes, the most popular of which is the following:

List of art works
Works executed jointly 
 Portret An-skiego (Portrait of An-ski) (1921), relief
 Widok z okna (Window view) (1930) oil on canvas, 88×76, in the harvest Muzeum Sztuki w Łodzi
 Martwa natura z kwiatami (Still life with flowers) oil on a glass 69,5×60,8, in private collections
 Droga do wioski (Road to the village) (ok. 1938)
 Studium kobiety z kwiatami (Study of a woman with flowers) (ok. 1930) oil on plywood, 72,5×61, in the harvest Muzeum Narodowego w Szczecinie
 Bukiet kwiatów w wazonie (A bouquet of flowers in a vase) (ok. 1930), oil on canvas, 80,5×69,5, in private collections
 Wioska (The village) oil on canvas 64,8×79,5
 Dziewczyna z gołąbkiem (The girl with a dove) oil on canvas, 73,2×59,7, in the collection of the Jewish Historical Institute
 Dziewczyna z koszem owoców (Girl with a basket of fruit)
 Widok na farę w Kazimierzu (View of the parish church in Kazimierz) oil on plywood 47×33, in private collections 
 Mury Kazimierskie (Kazimierz Walls) oil on cardboard, 39×22, in private collections 
 Martwa natura (Still life) (ok. 1930) oil on canvas, 80,5×71, in the collection of the National Museum in Warsaw
 Martwa natura (Still life) 70×49, in private collections
 Ulica Krakowska (Krakowska Street)
 Pejzaż z domami (Landscape with houses)
 Siostry (1935) (Sisters)
 Młoda kobieta z kwiatami (Young woman with flowers)
 Zamyślona (Pensive)
 Kobieta w szalu (The woman in the scarf)
 Dwie dziewczyny z owocami (Two girls with fruit)
 Dwie dziewczynki (Two girls)
 Postaci w pejzażu (Figures in the landscape) (ok. 1930), oil on canvas
 Portret mężczyzny w okularach (Portrait of a man with glasses), oil on cardboard, 36,5×32,5, in private collections
 Ulice miasta/ Widok miasta (City streets/ City view)  (on the reverse), oil on board, 50×61, in private collections
 Motyw z Helu (Theme from Hel) (ok. 1935), 60×71,5, oil on board, in the collection of the National Museum in Warsaw
 Przedmieście fabryczne (Factory suburb) (1937), oil on plywood, 61×70, in the collection of the District Museum in Bielsko-Biała
 Uliczka w Skoczowie (A street in Skoczów)
 Przydrożna topola (Roadside poplar) (ok. 1938), 64,5×89,6, in the collection of the Jewish Historical Institute
 Motyw ze Śląska Cieszyńskiego (Theme from Cieszyn Silesia) (1937), oil on canvas, 60×73,5, in the collection of the Jewish Historical Institute
 Widok z portu (View from the port) (ok. 1931), 42×45, oil on board, in private collections
 Motyw z zagłębia naftowego (A theme from the oil basin) (1938)
 Koncert (Concert)
 Zmrok (Nightfall)
 Dzieci
 Gołębiarz (Sniper)
 Rowerzyści (Bikers) (1934)
 Matka z dzieckiem (Mother with baby)
 Dziewczyna z gołębiem (The girl with the pigeon), oil on canvas, 80,5×65,8, in the collection of the Jewish Historical Institute
 Przedmieścia Krakowa (The suburbs of Krakow) (1934), oil on plywood, 61×75, in the collection of the Jewish Historical Institute
 Portret Moniki Żeromskiej (Portrait of Monika Żeromska) (1935)
 Martwa natura ze skrzypcami (Still life with a violin)
 Barka na Wiśle (Barge on the Vistula) (ok. 1930), in the collection of the Museum in Ein Harod
 Martwa natura z fajką (Still life with a pipe) (1930)
 Przy kuźni (At the forge) (1936)
 Przy pracy (During work) (1936)
 Ulica w miasteczku z dorożką i stołem przed domem/ Kobieta z owocami na paterze (A street in a town with a horse-drawn carriage and a table in front of the house/ Woman with fruit on a plate)  (on the reverse)
 Willa w ogrodzie (Villa in the garden) oil on plywood, 44×48, in the collection of the Museum of Art in Łódź
 Widok z tarasu (View from the terrace) (ok. 1935), 60×70, in private collections
 Żółte róże (Yellow roses) (1932) oil on canvas, 83×73, in the collection of the Museum of Art in Łódź
 Portret dziewczynki z kwiatami (Portrait of a girl with flowers) 87×62,5, in the collection of the National Museum in Warsaw link
 Martwa natura (na obrusie w kratę) (Still life (on the checkered tablecloth)), oil on canvas, 73×93, in the collection of the Jewish Historical Institute
 Miejska uliczka (City street) oil on canvas, 78×70, in private collections
 Widok miasta (City view), oil on cardboard, 27×44,5, in private collections
 Pejzaż wiejski (Rural landscape) (ok. 1930) oil on canvas, 64,5×72, in the collection of the Jewish Historical Institute
 Pejzaż małomiasteczkowy z kościołem w tle (A provincial landscape with a church in the background) (ok. 1933-35), oil on plywood, 62×70, in the collection of the Jewish Historical Institute
 Martwa natura we wnętrzu (Still life in the interior) (ok. 1935-39), oil on canvas, 80×100, in private collections
 Jarmark (Fair), 25×35, watercolor, gouache, ink on paper, in the collection of the Rynek Sztuki Gallery in Łódź

Works by Efraim
 Kulisy (Behind the scenes)
 Widok z okna (Window view) (before 1934), oil on canvas, 98.3 × 79.3, in the collection of the Jewish Historical Institute
 Martwa natura (Still life) (circa 1930), 80.5 × 71, in the collection of the National Museum in Warsaw
 Martwa natura z prymulką (Still life with a primula) (1934), oil on canvas, 70 × 49, in a private collection
 Chłopiec z lampą naftową (Boy with an oil lamp)
 Akt (Act)
 Chłopiec puszczający bańki mydlane (A boy blowing soap bubbles)
 Julka, in the collection of the State Hermitage Museum
 Gitarzysta (Guitarist)
 Chłopiec (Boy)
 Portret brata (Portrait of a brother)
 Port rybacki w Gdyni (Fishing port in Gdynia)
 Motyw Helu (Hel motif)
 Gladiole (Gladiolus) (1934)
 Studium chłopca (A boy study) (1933)
 Magda (1936)
 Kazimierz nad Wisłą (Kazimierz on the Vistula), in the collection of the Museum in Ein Harod
 Sprzedawczyni jabłek (Apple seller), in the collection of the Museum in Ein Harod
 Martwa natura z zieloną butelką (Still life with a green bottle) (circa 1940), oil on canvas, 57 × 71, in the collection of the Museum of the Academy of Fine Arts in Warsaw

Works by Menasze
 Chłopiec z wędką (A boy with a fishing rod) 100 × 83.5, in the collection of the Jewish Historical Institute
 Portret mężczyzny w kapeluszu (Portrait of a man in a hat) oil on canvas, 58.5 × 46.2, in the collection of the Jewish Historical Institute
 Przystań (Harbor) (1931), 43 × 47, oil on plywood, in the collection of the Jewish Historical Institute
 Widok na Kazimierz nad Wisłą (View of Kazimierz on the Vistula River) (1930), oil on canvas, in the collection of the National Museum in Warsaw
 Widok na Kazimierz nad Wisłą (View of Kazimierz on the Vistula River), 72.6 × 65.5, oil on canvas, in the collection of the Jewish Historical Institute
 Widok na Kazimierz nad Wisłą (View of Kazimierz on the Vistula River), 72 × 77.2, oil on canvas, in the collection of the Jewish Historical Institute
 Rynek w Kazimierzu (The market square in Kazimierz) (1934), oil on plywood, 40 × 50, private collection
 Łódka (Boat), in the collection of the Museum in Ein Harod
 Mulatka (1931), (1931), oil on canvas, 60 × 48, in the collection of the Jewish Historical Institute
 Martwa natura (Still life) (1930), oil on canvas, 83 × 72, in the collection of the National Museum in Warsaw
 Zaułek w Kazimierzu nad Wisłą (Alley in Kazimierz on the Vistula) (circa 1930-32), oil on plywood, 38.9 × 41, in the collection of the Jewish Historical Institute
 Motyw z Helu (Theme from Hel)
 Widok na Wawel' (View of the Wawel Castle)
 Martwa natura (Still life) (1940)

List of exhibitions 
 1922 IV Exhibition of Pictures and Sculptures
 1930 Society for the Encouragement of Fine Arts, Warsaw
 1931 Poznań
 1931 IPS, Łódź
 1931 Geneva, Musee Rath
 1933 IPS, Warsaw (two exhibitions)
 1933 College Art Association, New York
 1933 TPSP
 1934 XIX Biennale, Venice
 1934 Riga
 1835 Brussels
 1936 IPS, Warsaw
 1936 IPS, Lviv
 1938 Moravian Ostrava
 1939 IPS, Warsaw
 1939 TPSP
 1939 London

References

Primary references
 (Monika Żeromska, Wspomnienia, Część 1. Czytelnik, 1993, p. 145)
 (T. Wittlin, Ostatnia cyganeria. Czytelnik, 1989, pp. 147–149.)
 (The Virtual Shtetl Project) The Virtual Shtetl Project
 (The Official Website of the Artist Chaim Goldberg)

Research references

 Grób Szpryncy Seidenbeutel w bazie danych Cmentarza Żydowskiego przy ul. Okopowej w Warszawie
 Abraham Rotsztejn (born on 20.10.1934 in San Paolo, Brasil) about his maternal family from Warsaw.
 3,0 3,1 3,2 3,3 3,4 3,5 3,6 3,7 3,8 3,9 Jerzy Malinowski: Seidenbeutel Efraim, Seidenbeutel Jerzy, Seidenbeutel Menasze. W: Polski Słownik Biograficzny XXXVI Zeszyt 149. 1995, s. 163–167.
 Efraim i Menasze Seidenbeutlowie 1902-1945: Pośród braci...: obrazy / Efraim i Menasze Seidenbeutlowie 1902-1945: Among the brothers: pictures. Kazimierz Dolny: Muzeum Nadwiślańskie, 2007, s. 14. .
 Efraim i Menasze Seidenbeutlowie 1902–1945... s. 16
 6,00 6,01 6,02 6,03 6,04 6,05 6,06 6,07 6,08 6,09 6,10 6,11 6,12 6,13 Małgorzata Witek-Czyńska. Efraim i Menasze Seidebeutlowie – dzieło wspólne. „Gazeta Antykwaryczna”. 70 (1), 2002.
 Efraim i Menasze Seidenbeutlowie 1902–1945... s. 35
 Wiesław Budzyński: Miasto Schulza. Prószyński i S-ka, 2005, s. 401. .
 Efraim i Menasze Seidenbeutlowie 1902–1945... s. 37
  J. Jaworska: Nie wszystek umrę ...: twórczość plastyczna Polaków w hitlerowskich więzieniach i obozach koncentracyjnych, 1939-1945. Książka i Wiedza, 1975, s. 40.
 List of the Jews Deported from the Bialystok Prison to Concentration Camp Stutthof on November 21, 1943 (ang.). [dostęp 2009-10-11].
 Szlak Dziedzictwa Żydowskiego w Białymstoku. [dostęp 2009-10-10].
 The Central Database of Shoah Victims' Names: Pages of Testimony (ang.). [dostęp 11 października 2009].
 The Central Database of Shoah Victims' Names: Pages of Testimony (ang.). [dostęp 11 października 2009].
 The Central Database of Shoah Victims' Names: Pages of Testimony (ang.). [dostęp 11 października 2009].
 16,0 16,1 Zwoje (The Scrolls) 3 (28), 2001. [dostęp 2009-10-10].
 17,0 17,1 17,2 Monika Żeromska: Wspomnienia, Część 1. Czytelnik, 1993, s. 145. .
 18,0 18,1 Antoni Uniechowski: Antoni Uniechowski o sobie i innych. Iskry, 1966, s. 121–124.
 Efraim i Menasze Seidenbeutlowie 1902–1945...' s. 8
 20,0 20,1 Tadeusz Wittlin: Ostatnia cyganeria. Czytelnik, 1989, s. 147-149. .
 Włodzimierz Bartoszewicz: Buda na Powiślu. PIW, 1966.
 Jan Zamoyski: Łukaszowcy: malarze i malarstwo Bractwa św. Łukasza. Wydawnictwa Artystyczne i Filmowe, 1989, s. 52. .
 Leopold Infeld: Szkice z przeszłości: wspomnienia. Państwowy Instytut Wydawniczy, 1964, s. 40.
 Hanna Mortkowicz-Olczakowa: Bunt wspomnień. Państwowy Instytut Wydawniczy, 1961, s. 339.
 Felicja Lilpop Krance: Powroty. 1991, s. 38.
 Małgorzata Kitowska-Łysiak: Schulzowskie marginalia. Wydawn. KUL, 2007, s. 131.
 Wiesław Budzyński: Miasto Schulza. Prószyński i S-ka, 2005, s. 401. .
 Joanna Pollakówna: Byli bracia malarze... : o życiu i malowaniu braci Efraima i Menasze Seidenbeutlów. Warszawa: Wydawnictwo Hotel Sztuki, 2002. .
 Efraim i Menasze Seidenbeutlowie 1902–1945...' s. 26
 30,0 30,1 Jerzy Malinowski, Barbara Brus-Malinowska: Malarstwo i rzeźba żydów polskich w XIX i XX wieku. Warszawa: Wydawn. Naukowe PWN, 2000. .
 Waldemar Odorowski: Malarze Kazimierza nad Wisłą. Krajowa Agencja Wydawnicza, 1991, s. 70.
 Andrzej K. Olszewski: Dzieje sztuki polskiej 1890-1980 w zarysie. Wydawn. Interpress, 1988, s. 62. .
 33,0 33,1 Irena Kossowska: Kultura polska: Efraim i Menasze Seidenbeutel. luty 2005. [dostęp 2009-10-11].
 T. Czyżewski. Z wystaw: Jeszcze kilku młodych w IPS-i.e. „Prosto z Mostu: tygodnik literacko-artystyczny”. 5 (6), s. 7, 1939.
 Kolekcja sztuki XX/XXI w.. [dostęp 2009-10-11].
 Efraim i Menasze Seidenbeutlowie 1902–1945... s. 57
 Martwa natura z kwiatami. [dostęp 2009-10-12].
 Droga do wioski. [dostęp 2009-10-12].
 Bukiet kwiatów w wazonie. [dostęp 2009-10-12].
 Efraim i Menasze Seidenbeutlowie 1902–1945... s. 70
 41,0 41,1 41,2 Efraim i Menasze Seidenbeutlowie 1902–1945... s. 26
 Efraim i Menasze Seidenbeutlowie 1902–1945... s. 61
 Martwa natura. [dostęp 2009-10-12].
 44,0 44,1 Efraim i Menasze Seidenbeutlowie 1902–1945... s. 27
 45,0 45,1 45,2 Efraim i Menasze Seidenbeutlowie 1902–1945... s. 24
 Efraim i Menasze Seidenbeutlowie 1902–1945... s. 25
 Efraim i Menasze Seidenbeutlowie 1902–1945... s. 90
 Efraim i Menasze Seidenbeutlowie 1902–1945... s. 65
 Efraim i Menasze Seidenbeutlowie 1902–1945... s. 84-85
 Efraim i Menasze Seidenbeutlowie 1902–1945... s. 76
 Efraim i Menasze Seidenbeutlowie 1902–1945... s. 87
 Efraim i Menasze Seidenbeutlowie 1902–1945... s. 83
 Efraim i Menasze Seidenbeutlowie 1902–1945... s. 91
 Efraim i Menasze Seidenbeutlowie 1902–1945... s. 78
 55,0 55,1 Efraim i Menasze Seidenbeutlowie 1902–1945... s. 28
 56,0 56,1 Efraim i Menasze Seidenbeutlowie 1902–1945... s. 29
 Efraim i Menasze Seidenbeutlowie 1902–1945... s. 66
 Efraim i Menasze Seidenbeutlowie 1902–1945... s. 69
 Efraim i Menasze Seidenbeutlowie 1902–1945... s. 92-93
 Efraim i Menasze Seidenbeutlowie 1902–1945... s. 80
 Efraim i Menasze Seidenbeutlowie 1902–1945... s. 95
 Efraim i Menasze Seidenbeutlowie 1902–1945... s. 81
 Efraim i Menasze Seidenbeutlowie 1902–1945... s. 82
 Efraim i Menasze Seidenbeutlowie 1902–1945... s. 75
 Efraim i Menasze Seidenbeutlowie 1902–1945... s. 94
 Efraim i Menasze Seidenbeutlowie 1902–1945... s. 86
 Efraim i Menasze Seidenbeutlowie 1902–1945... s. 68
 Efraim i Menasze Seidenbeutlowie 1902–1945... s. 56
 Efraim i Menasze Seidenbeutlowie 1902–1945... s. 62
 Efraim i Menasze Seidenbeutlowie 1902–1945... s. 96
 Efraim i Menasze Seidenbeutlowie 1902–1945... s. 63
 Efraim i Menasze Seidenbeutlowie 1902–1945... s. 64
 Efraim i Menasze Seidenbeutlowie 1902–1945... s. 79
 Efraim i Menasze Seidenbeutlowie 1902–1945... s. 53
 Efraim i Menasze Seidenbeutlowie 1902–1945... s. 55
 Efraim i Menasze Seidenbeutlowie 1902–1945... s. 54
 Efraim i Menasze Seidenbeutlowie 1902–1945... s. 88
 Efraim i Menasze Seidenbeutlowie 1902–1945... s. 71
 Efraim i Menasze Seidenbeutlowie 1902–1945... s. 58
 Efraim i Menasze Seidenbeutlowie 1902–1945... s. 52
 Efraim i Menasze Seidenbeutlowie 1902–1945... s. 31
 Efraim i Menasze Seidenbeutlowie 1902–1945... s. 30

Further reading
 Efraim i Menasze Seidenbeutlowie 1902-1945: Pośród braci...: obrazy / Efraim i Menasze Seidenbeutlowie 1902-1945: Among the brothers: pictures. Kazimierz Dolny: Muzeum Nadwiślańskie, 2007
 Joanna Pollakówna: Byli bracia malarze... : o życiu i malowaniu braci Efraima i Menasze Seidenbeutlów. Warszawa: Wydawnictwo Hotel Sztuki, 2002

External links
  "Mishkan LeOmanut": Museum of Art, Ein Harod, Zusia Efron, Curator December 1970
 Seidenbeutels' works in Central Jewish Library

Artists from Warsaw
Sibling duos
Polish Jews who died in the Holocaust
People who died in Flossenbürg concentration camp
Polish people executed in Nazi concentration camps
Executed people from Masovian Voivodeship
1907 births
1945 deaths
Articles needing cleanup from October 2013
Polish civilians killed in World War II